Culmenella rezvoji is a species of air-breathing freshwater snail with sinistral shell, aquatic pulmonate gastropod mollusk in the family Planorbidae. This species is endemic to Japan.

References

External links 
  https://web.archive.org/web/20110713121903/http://www.jpnrdb.com/search.php?mode=map&q=110504150040696

Planorbidae
Gastropods described in 1929
Molluscs of Japan
Taxa named by Wassili Adolfovitch Lindholm
Taxonomy articles created by Polbot